Shermon Tang Sheung Man is a Hong Kong television actress of Hakka ancestry. Shermon was awarded the "Miss Photogenic" award at the 2005 Miss Hong Kong pageant, launching her career in showbiz. Shermon attended King George V School, an International School before studying in Australia.
Actually, Shermon's childhood ambition was to become a lawyer or a nurse. But as a child, she took part in Kelly Chen's debut movie "Whatever Will Be, Will Be" (also starring Aaron Kwok). "At the time, there was a big group of kids and we were all happily singing and dancing without a care. Acting gives me a huge sense of satisfaction!" she recalls. In 2006, Shermon finds herself on the smaller screen as she plays Lawrence Cheng's younger sister Ko Yau Ching in Welcome to the House (2006).

Tang is daughter of TVB actor Tang Ying Mun (English Tang) and married Andrew Joy on March 6, 2011.

Filmography

Television Series

Television Shows

Film

Awards

Miss Photogenic 2005

External links
 Shermon Tang Network English Website

References

TVB actors
Hong Kong people of Hakka descent
People from Huiyang
Living people
1983 births
Alumni of King George V School, Hong Kong